Yewande Adekoya  (born 20 January 1983), is a Nigerian actress, filmmaker.

Early life and education
Yewande was born in Lagos State but hails from Ososa-Ijebu in Ogun State southwestern Nigeria.
She attended Bright star nursery and primary school, before proceeding for her secondary education at Bright Star Comprehensive High School. She obtained a Bachelor of Arts (B.A) degree in Mass communications from Babcock University. Yewande Adekoya is happily married with children.  But in April, 2022, Yewande announced that her marriage has ended. The mother of two, while publicising the end of her marriage, said she had been experiencing emotional abuse for 14 years.

Career
Yewande Adekoya began acting in 2002 with Alphabash Music And Theatre Group. She scripted and produced her first content in 2006 titled "Life Secret". She has produced, directed and featured in several Nigerian films such as Omo Elemosho, a 2012 film that featured Bimbo Oshin, Muyiwa Ademola and Yomi Fash-Lanso. The film also received 5 nominations at the 10th Africa Movie Academy Awards. She also got nominated for "best new actress" in the Yoruba category at 2014 City People Entertainment Awards. In the same year, her role in Kudi Klepto got her best actress in a leading role nomination at 2014 Best of Nollywood Awards. In December 2014, Adekoya won the "most promising act" award at Yoruba Movie Academy Awards. Her film Kurukuru earned her the best actress award at the 2016 ACIA ceremony. In 2017, her film, Iyawo Adedigba, got the award for "best movie of the year" at the 2017 City People Movie Awards.

Selected filmography
Life Secrets 1 (2006)
Life Secrets 2 (2007)
Igbo Dudu (2009)
Omo Elemosho (2012)
Kudi Klepto (2013)
Emere (2014)
Kurukuru (2015)
The Sacrifice (2016)
Tamara (2016)
Ayanmo (2016)
Ota Ile (2016)
Once Upon a Time (2016)
Iyawo Adedigba (2017)
Fadaka (2018)
Belladonna (2018)
Odun Ibole (2018)
Ewatomi (2018)
Omo Aniibire (2019)

Àwọn Àmì Ẹ̀ye 
2014 :Òṣèrébìrin tuntun tó peregedé julọ̀ - City People Entertainment Awards

2014: Aláṣeyorí Òṣèrébìrin  - Yorùbá Movie Academy Awards

2014: Ipa Aláṣeyorí jùlọ - Yorùbá Heritage Awards, United States

2016 - Òṣèrébìrin tí ó dára jù lọ - ACIA

+

:

Ipa Aláṣeyorí jùlọ - Yorùbá Heritage Awards, United States

See also
 List of Nigerian film producers
List of Yoruba people

References

Nigerian film actresses
Yoruba actresses
Nigerian film directors
Nigerian women film directors
Nigerian film producers
Actresses from Lagos State
Actresses in Yoruba cinema
Babcock University alumni
21st-century Nigerian actresses
Living people
1984 births
Actresses from Ogun State
Nigerian media personalities